Okko is a comic book written and illustrated by Hubert Chabuel also known as Hub, with colors done by Hub and Stephan Pecayo. It was originally published in French as a series of books starting in 2005. An English translation by Edward Gauvin began to be published in 2006 by the French Delcourt, Archaia Studios Press. Although it is a comic book, the series is contains adult content, graphic violence, and nudity; it is thus intended for mature readers.

Premise

The action of the first cycle of Okko takes place at the far end of the known lands of the Empire of Pajan. Pajan itself is a vast and diversified island, surrounded by a multitude of archipelagoes.  Its name is derived from that of its Imperial Family. Though the Pajans have reigned for a millennium, in the last few decades three major families—the Ataku, the Bashimon, and the Yommo—have called into question their legitimacy and now refuse to cease their battles against the Imperial Family. These power struggles have destabilized the Empire, and famine and catastrophes follow one another. This period of chaos is commonly called the Era of Asagiri (the Time of Mists).

The Okko series begins in the middle of this tumultuous period, in the year 1108 of the official calendar. The way of life and various habits of the inhabitants of the Empire of Pajan are rather close to those of medieval Japan. However, a major difference is the existence of supernatural creatures and magic. A technological revolution occurred a few centuries prior to the beginning of the series, allowing the creation of exo bunraku, colossal combat armors handled from within by marionettists. Their use has radically changed the traditional art of war in the Pajan Empire. The Ataku family has taken the lead in the construction and the handling of these machines of war.

The Cycle of Water

The Cycle of Water was originally published as a two-issue mini-series by Delcourt in 2005, and has been reprinted by Archaia Studios Press as a four-issue mini-series (2006–2007).

Book One

In French (Original):
Delcourt, January 2005, 

In English (Reprint):
Archaia Studios Press, Dec. 2006,  (first half, as Issue 1 of 4)
Archaia Studios Press, Feb. 2007 (second half, as Issue 2 of 4)

The year is 1108 in the official calendar of the Pajan Empire. Far from the fields of battle, Okko the ronin heads a small group of demon hunters, wandering the realms of Empire. He is accompanied by Noburo, a mysterious giant who hides his face behind a red oni mask, and the whimsical monk Noshin, the saké lover with the power to summon and commune with the spirits of nature.

The young fisherman Tikku enlists the group's help in finding his sister, the geisha Little Carp, who was kidnapped by pirates. But the quest will have a price, and will lead our four heroes much farther afield than they’d ever imagined....

Book Two

In French (Original):
Delcourt, November 2005,  
Delcourt, January 2006, 

In English (Reprint):
Archaia Studios Press, April 2007 (first half, as Issue 3 of 4)
Archaia Studios Press, June 2007 (second half, as Issue 4 of 4)
Archaia Studios Press, August 2007  (Hardcover compilation)

While on the trail of Little Carp and her captors, Okko, Noburo, Tikku and Noshin are blown by a storm towards the Satorro castle.  While accommodated well, the travellers begin to become suspicious of the mysterious atmosphere which reigns in the castle.  Why was it deserted by the Kami?  Tikku, impatient for an answer, decides to inspect the castle and unravel the mystery...

The Cycle of Earth

The Cycle of Earth was originally published as a two-issue mini-series by Delcourt in 2007-2008, and has been reprinted by Archaia as a four-issue mini-series (2008– 2009).

Book One

In French (Original):
Delcourt, January 2007, 

In English (Reprint):
Archaia Studios Press, July 2008 (first half, as Issue 1 of 4)
Archaia Studios Press, July 2008 (second half, as Issue 2 of 4)

It is the Winter of 1109 in the official calendar of Pajan. Okko and his faithful companions arrive at the City of Black Powder, escaping from the bloodthirsty battles on the Plains of Pajan.  While seeking a guide to help them cross the perilous Mountains of the Seven Monasteries, they meet a skillful warrior woman: Windreaper (Fauche-Le-Vent in French). A scout with information for Okko is murdered and consequently their path crosses that of two sinister monks bearing on their tengai a raven emblem, symbol of dark foreboding! The group sets off to the monasteries to investigate this mysterious brotherhood...

Book Two

In French (Original):
Delcourt, February 2008, 

In English (Reprint):
Archaia, November 2009 (first half, as issue 3 of 4)
Archaia, December 2009 (second half, as issue 4 of 4)
Archaia, May 2010  (Hardcover compilation)

Still on the trail of the demonic monks, Okko and his companions climb the immense mountain known as The Roof of the World and reach the mysterious eighth monastery. There they gain entrance to the forbidden library, the heart of Pajan's knowledge, and discover the dark secret of their enemies: an army of the dead from the bowels of the earth prepares to invade the kingdom...

The Cycle of Air

The Cycle of Air was originally published as a two-issue mini-series by Delcourt in 2009-2010, and has been reprinted in English by Archaia as a four-issue mini-series (2010).

Book One

In French (Original):
Delcourt, April 2009, 

In English (Reprint):
Archaia, April 2010 (first half, as issue 1 of 4)
Archaia, May 2010 (second half, as issue 2 of 4)

Okko is called upon to assist the daughter of Lady Mayudama, who has retreated into a profound silence. She had since been seen by the best doctors, who were unable even to assert the least diagnosis. Okko has proven to be her last resort. But a strange force that has been prowling around the region for over a week has also arranged a meeting with the ronin for a duel of incomparable violence...

Book Two

In French (Original):
Delcourt, May 2010, 

In English (Reprint):
Archaia, September 2010 (first half, as issue 3 of 4)
Archaia, October 2010 (second half, as issue 4 of 4)
Archaia, February 2011  (Hardcover compilation)

Left for dead after a terrible duel, Okko's body lies in the countryside, his right hand severed, while the heavenly winds rise and the kamikaze (divine wind) cocoon season begins. His comrades have only one thought: to avenge their master, their friend. But even together, can they hope to overcome this killing machine, this formidable demon hunter in a bunraku, who goes by the name of Kubban Kiritsu, before he hunts down Noburo?

The Cycle of Fire

The Cycle of Fire was originally published as a two-issue mini-series by Delcourt in 2011-2012

Book One

In French (Original):

Delcourt, October 2011, 

Two great clans of the Empire have secretly arranged a marriage to seal a powerful alliance and put an end to the devastating Era of Mists.  To keep out the rival clans, the venue is kept confidential and a special guard has been created of the two families one hundred most valiant samurai. Quite unofficially, Okko and his companions have also been summoned ...

Book Two

In French (Original):

Delcourt, December 2012, 

Held responsible for the prevailing chaos, Okko and his companions are chased by the best bounty hunters in the Empire. His Lordship the Daimyo Oyatsu doubles the reward promised to those who offered him the head of the ronin. For his honour and the hope of saving the lives of his own, Okko has no choice but to unravel the mystery of what appears to be a dark conspiracy ...

The Cycle of Emptiness 

The Cycle of Emptiness was originally published by Delcourt in 2015-2016.

In French (Original, Le cycle du vide - Édition Intégrale):

Delcourt, October 2016, 

The story of Okko nears its end. A few last mysteries are revealed about his life.

Notes 

2005 comics debuts
Archaia Studios Press titles
Fantasy comics
Alternate history comics
French comics titles